The following is a list of notable deaths in September 2018.

Entries for each day are listed alphabetically by surname. A typical entry lists information in the following sequence:
 Name, age, country of citizenship at birth, subsequent country of citizenship (if applicable), reason for notability, cause of death (if known), and reference.

September 2018

1
Kenneth Bowen, 86, Welsh operatic tenor singer.
Chen Xian, 98, Chinese politician, Director of the National Bureau of Statistics (1974–1981).
Carl Duering, 95, German-born British actor (Operation Daybreak, A Clockwork Orange, Possession).
Irving Petlin, 83, American artist, liver cancer.
Freddie Plaskett, 91, British major general and business executive.
Tarun Sagar, 51, Indian Jain monk, sallekhana.
Margit Sandemo, 94, Norwegian-Swedish author (The Legend of the Ice People).
Jean Seitlinger, 93, French politician, lawyer and writer, Deputy (1956–1962, 1973–1997) and MEP (1979–1984).
Mykola Shytyuk, 64, Ukrainian historian, stabbed.
Randy Weston, 92, American jazz pianist and composer.
Ehsan Yarshater, 98, Iranian scholar, director of the Center for Iranian Studies at Columbia University.

2
Elsa Bloise, 92, Argentine stage actress.
Clarence Brandley, 66, American janitor wrongly convicted of murder, pneumonia.
Ian Lariba, 23, Filipino Olympic table tennis player (2016), acute myeloid leukemia.
Cornel Piper, 81, Canadian football player (Winnipeg Blue Bombers), cancer and dementia.
Kawther Ramzi, 87, Egyptian actress, circulatory collapse.
Conway Savage, 58, Australian rock keyboardist (Nick Cave and the Bad Seeds), brain tumour.
Frank Lee Sprague, 60, American guitarist and composer.
Giovanni Battista Urbani, 94, Italian politician, Mayor of Savona (1957–1958), Senator (1972–1987).
Claire Wineland, 21, American cystic fibrosis assistance advocate, stroke.
Fred Zamberletti, 86, American athletic trainer (Minnesota Vikings), spinal osteomyelitis.

3
Rama Chowdhury, 81, Bangladeshi author, complications from diabetes.
Lydia Clarke, 95, American actress (The Atomic City) and photographer, complications from pneumonia.
Klaus Gerwien, 77, German footballer (Eintracht Braunschweig).
Ian Hampshire, 70, Australian football player and manager (Geelong, Footscray).
Jalaluddin Haqqani, 78–79, Afghan militant, founder of the Haqqani network.
Warren Jones, 74, American judge, Justice of the Idaho Supreme Court (2007–2017), stroke.
Ju Kyu-chang, 89, North Korean politician, director of nuclear and missile development, pancytopenia.
Paul Koech, 49, Kenyan long-distance runner, half marathon world champion (1998).
Jacqueline Pearce, 74, British actress (Blake's 7, Dark Season, Doctor Who), lung cancer.
Gordon Phillips, 72, English football player (Hayes, Brentford) and manager (Staines Town), cancer.
Katyna Ranieri, 93, Italian singer and actress (Captain Phantom).
Thomas Rickman, 78, American screenwriter (Coal Miner's Daughter, Hooper, Truman), cancer.

4
Joseph Marie Régis Belzile, 87, Canadian-born Chadian Roman Catholic prelate, Bishop of Moundou (1974–1985).
Marijan Beneš, 67, Bosnian Olympic boxer (1976), European amateur (1973) and pro super welterweight champion (1979–1981), complications from Alzheimer's disease.
István Bethlen, 72, Hungarian aristocrat and economist, MP (1990–1994).
Sydney Anicetus Charles, 92, Trinidadian-born Grenadian Roman Catholic prelate, Bishop of Saint George's in Grenada (1974–2002).
Sheldon S. Cohen, 91, American attorney, Commissioner of Internal Revenue (1965–1969), heart failure.
Ralph Wolfe Cowan, 86, American portrait artist.
Bill Daily, 91, American actor (I Dream of Jeannie, The Bob Newhart Show) and game show panelist (Match Game).
Don Gardner, 87, American rhythm and blues singer ("I Need Your Lovin'").
Jason Hairston, 47, American football player (San Francisco 49ers, Denver Broncos) and hunting gear salesman, suicide.
Vladeta Jerotić, 94, Serbian neuropsychiatrist and author.
Ian Johnston, 71, Australian Olympic coxswain (1960), cancer.
Christopher Lawford, 63, American actor (Terminator 3: Rise of the Machines, Thirteen Days, All My Children), memoirist and political activist, heart attack.
Lee Wang-pyo, 64, South Korean professional wrestler and martial artist, gallbladder cancer.
Ab McDonald, 82, Canadian ice hockey player (Chicago Blackhawks, Montreal Canadiens, St. Louis Blues), cancer.
Bertrand Osborne, 83, Montserrat politician, Chief Minister (1996–1997).
A. George Pradel, 80, American politician, Mayor of Naperville, Illinois (1995–2015), cancer.
John W. Rogerson, 83, British Anglican priest and biblical scholar.
Elisa Serna, 75, Spanish protest singer-songwriter, heart attack.

5
Roger Aguilar Salazar, 79, Mexican politician, Deputy-elect (since 2018), cerebral hemorrhage.
Imrich Andrejčák, 77, Slovak general, last Defence Minister of Czechoslovakia (1992), first Defence Minister of Slovakia (1993–1994).
Rachael Bland, 40, Welsh journalist and presenter (BBC Radio 5 Live, BBC North West Tonight), breast cancer.
Jim Borst, 86, Dutch Roman Catholic missionary (Saint Joseph's Missionary Society of Mill Hill), heart failure.
Minor J. Coon, 97, American biochemist.
Robert Coulter, 88, Northern Irish politician, MLA for Antrim North (1998–2011).
François Flohic, 98, French admiral (Free French Naval Forces).
Salawat Gallyamov, 58, Russian linguist.
Dennis Green, 87, Australian sprint canoeist, Olympic bronze medalist (1956), cancer.
Erik Hauri, 52, American geochemist, cancer.
Arthur Lawrence Hellyer Jr., 95, American radio and television broadcaster.
Mike Hogewood, 63, American sportscaster (Raycom Sports, FSN South) and professional wrestling commentator (Ring of Honor), heart attack.
Shubhangi Joshi, 72, Indian actress (Kahe Diya Pardes), stroke.
Dick Lane, 91, American baseball player (Chicago White Sox).
Diane Leather, 85, British Olympic middle-distance runner (1960).
Makdah Murah, 62, Syrian actress.
Madeleine Yayodele Nelson, 69, American musician.
Freddie Oversteegen, 92, Dutch resistance member.
Lise Payette, 87, Canadian journalist, writer and politician, MNA (1976–1981).
Alan Peart, 96, New Zealand World War II fighter ace (Royal New Zealand Air Force).
Gilles Pelletier, 93, Canadian actor (Jesus of Montreal, The Barbarian Invasions, R.C.M.P.).
Vince Phason, 65, American football player (Edmonton Eskimos, Winnipeg Blue Bombers, Montreal Concordes), complications from traffic collision.
Beatriz Segall, 92, Brazilian actress (Vale Tudo), pneumonia.
Bhagwatikumar Sharma, 84, Indian Gujarati writer and journalist.
John Stacpoole, 98, New Zealand architect and architectural historian.
Rudolph Edward Torrini, 95, American sculptor, complications from Alzheimer's disease.
Priscila Uppal, 43, Canadian poet, synovial sarcoma.

6
Peter Benson, 75, English actor (Heartbeat, Blackadder, Albion Market).
Michel Bonnevie, 96, French basketball player (national team), Olympic silver medalist (1948).
Richard DeVos, 92, American businessman (Amway) and sports team owner (Orlando Magic), complications from infection.
Philippe Eidel, 61, French music producer, writer and film composer.
Ken Eyre, 76, British rugby league player (Hunslet, Leeds, Keighley).
Liz Fraser, 88, British actress (I'm All Right Jack, Carry On Regardless, Dad's Army), complications from surgery.
Will Jordan, 91, American comedian and actor (I Wanna Hold Your Hand), complications of a stroke.
Johnny Kingdom, 79, English wildlife filmmaker (Johnny's New Kingdom), digger rollover.
Gilbert Lazard, 98, French linguist and Iranologist.
Oleg Lobov, 80, Russian politician.
Sylvia Meehan, 89, Irish women's rights activist.
Wilson Moreira, 81, Brazilian sambista, singer and songwriter.
Thad Mumford, 67, American television producer and writer (The Electric Company, M*A*S*H, The Cosby Show), Emmy winner (1973).
Alan Oakman, 88, English cricketer (Sussex, national team).
Burt Reynolds, 82, American actor (Smokey and the Bandit, Boogie Nights, Deliverance), Emmy winner (1991), heart attack.
Claudio Scimone, 83, Italian conductor (I Solisti Veneti).

7
Gaston-Armand Amaudruz, 97, Swiss neo-fascist political philosopher and Holocaust denier.
Jacques Amyot, 93, Canadian long-distance swimmer, cancer.
Steve Andreas, 82, American psychotherapist and author, complications from Parkinson's disease.
Jonas Algirdas Antanaitis, 97, Lithuanian politician, MP (1977–1995).
Julio Blanck, 64, Argentine journalist, cancer.
Samuel Bodman, 79, American politician, Secretary of Energy (2005–2009), complications from primary progressive aphasia.
Joris Borghouts, 79, Dutch Egyptologist.
Chang Baohua, 87, Chinese xiangsheng actor.
Joel M. Charon, 78, American sociologist.
Janis Claxton, 53, Australian choreographer, lung cancer.
Vincent Cyril Richard Arthur Charles Crabbe, 94, Ghanaian judge, Justice of the Supreme Court.
Drago Grdenić, 99, Croatian chemist and crystallographer.
Marcelite J. Harris, 75, American air force general, first black woman general in the U.S. Air Force.
Kurt Helmudt, 74, Danish rower, Olympic champion (1964).
Anna Karabessini, 95, Greek folk singer and songwriter.
Alexander Margulis, 97, Yugoslavian-born American professor.
Mac Miller, 26, American rapper ("Donald Trump", "Frick Park Market", "Self Care") and record producer, accidental drug overdose.
Ingemar Mundebo, 87, Swedish politician, MP (1965–1980), Governor of Uppsala County (1980–1986), Economy minister (1978–1979).
Hans Oleak, 88, German astrophysicist.
Szarlota Pawel, 71, Polish comic book artist.
Beverly Polcyn, 90, American actress (Not Another Teen Movie, Hook, Date Movie).
Donald Robinson, 95, Australian Anglican prelate, Archbishop of Sydney (1982–1992).
Micheline Rozan, 89, French producer, co-founder of the International Centre for Theatre Research.
Bill Shaw, 94, American gospel singer (The Blackwood Brothers).
Mohsen Vaziri-Moghaddam, 94, Iranian abstract painter.
Paweł Waloszek, 80, Polish motorcycle speedway rider.
Sheila White, 69, British actress (Oliver!, I, Claudius) and singer, heart failure.
Yang Side, 96, Chinese PLA general.

8
Tito Capobianco, 87, Argentine-born American stage director (Pittsburgh Opera), lung cancer.
Gennadi Gagulia, 70, Abkhazian politician, Prime Minister (1995–1997, 2002–2003, since 2018), traffic collision.
Giancarlo Galdiolo, 69, Italian footballer (Fiorentina, Sampdoria), frontotemporal dementia.
Reidar Goa, 76, Norwegian footballer (Viking, national team).
Christopher Harper-Bill, 71, British medieval historian.
Lorraine H. Morton, 99, American politician, Mayor of Evanston, Illinois (1993–2009).
Abu Hassan Omar, 77, Malaysian politician, MP (1978–1997), Menteri Besar of Selangor (1997–2000), heart attack.
Ramin Hossein-Panahi, 23, Iranian convicted Kurdish insurgent, execution by hanging.
Erich Riedl, 85, German politician, member of Bundestag (1969–1998).
Chelsi Smith, 45, American beauty pageant winner (Miss USA 1995, Miss Universe 1995), liver cancer.
John Tovey, 85, British restaurateur.
Michael Varley, 78, British Olympic boxer (1964).
Richard Vincent, Baron Vincent of Coleshill, 87, British military officer and life peer.
Yang Zhenya, 90, Chinese diplomat, ambassador to Japan (1988–1993).

9
Simon Adut Yuang, South Sudanese Episcopal prelate, Bishop of Yirol (since 2015), plane crash.
Frank Andersson, 62, Swedish wrestler (NJPW, WCW) and reality show contestant (Let's Dance 2011), Olympic bronze medalist (1984), bacterial lung infection.
Frank Davis, 82, American politician, member of the Oklahoma House of Representatives (1978–2004).
Silvio Grassetti, 82, Italian Grand Prix motorcycle road racer.
Adrian C. Louis, 72, American Lovelock Paiute author and screenwriter (Skins).
Mr. Catra, 49, Brazilian singer, stomach cancer.
Krystian Popiela, 20, Polish footballer (Cagliari), traffic collision.
Beat Richner, 71, Swiss pediatrician and cellist.
Bill Smith, 80, English cricketer (Wiltshire, Surrey).
Paul Stuffel, 91, American baseball player (Philadelphia Phillies).
Wallace Tripp, 78, American illustrator (Amelia Bedelia) and author, Parkinson's disease.
Javier Usabiaga Arroyo, 79, Mexican politician, Minister of Agriculture (2000–2005) and Deputy (2009–2012).

10
Kurt Benirschke, 94, German-born American geneticist and pathologist.
Chris Buttars, 76, American politician, member of the Utah State Senate (2001–2011).
Adam Clymer, 81, American journalist (The New York Times), pancreatic cancer.
Warrington Colescott, 97, American artist.
Peter Donat, 90, Canadian-born American actor (The Godfather: Part II, The X-Files, The China Syndrome), complications from diabetes.
István Géczi, 74, Hungarian footballer (Ferencváros, national team), Olympic silver medalist (1972).
Johannes Geldenhuys, 83, South African military commander, Chief of the Defence Force (1985–1990).
Hu Fo, 86, Taiwanese political scientist and activist, member of Academia Sinica, fall.
Albin F. Irzyk, 101, American military officer.
Robert Harold Porter, 85, Canadian politician, MP (1984–1993).
Bianca Reinert, 52, Brazilian ornithologist, cancer.
Paul Virilio, 86, French philosopher and urbanist, heart attack.
Roy Wagner, 79, American anthropologist.
Co Westerik, 94, Dutch painter and photographer.

11
Richard Newbold Adams, 94, American anthropologist.
Peter J. Barnes Jr., 89, American politician, member of the New Jersey General Assembly (1996–2007).
Edwin Davies, 72, English football club owner (Bolton Wanderers) and management accountant.
Fenella Fielding, 90, English actress (Follow a Star, Carry On Regardless, Carry On Screaming!), stroke.
Thomas Aquinas Higgins, 86, American judge.
Jim Houston, 80, American football player (Cleveland Browns), complications from dementia and ALS.
Kalle Könkkölä, 68, Finnish politician and human rights activist, MP (1983–1987), pneumonia.
Cheikhna Ould Mohamed Laghdaf, Mauritanian diplomat and politician, Foreign Minister (1962–1963, 1978–1979).
Siegfried Linkwitz, 82, American audio engineer (Linkwitz-Riley filter), prostate cancer.
M. Sam Mannan, 64, Bangladeshi chemical engineer.
Kulsoom Nawaz, 68, Pakistani politician, member of the National Assembly (2017–2018), complications from lymphoma.
Don Newman, 60, American basketball coach (San Antonio Spurs, Washington Wizards) and football player (Saskatchewan Roughriders), cancer.
Don Panoz, 83, American executive (Panoz, NanoLumens, Mylan), pancreatic cancer.
Roger W. H. Sargent, 91, British chemical engineer.
Tchan Fou-li, 102, Hong Kong photographer.
Charlene Todman, 87, Australian athlete.

12
Shlomo Aronson, 81, Israeli landscape architect.
Pasquale Buba, 72, American film editor (Heat, Day of the Dead, Mister Rogers' Neighborhood), cancer.
Ronald Carter, 71, British linguist.
Don Corbett, 75, American college basketball coach (Lincoln, North Carolina A&T), cancer.
Barry Cunningham, 78, Australian politician, MP for McMillan (1980–1990, 1993–1996).
Hossein Erfani, 76, Iranian voice actor, lung cancer.
Robert Gillam, 72, American investor, stroke.
Robert A. Johnson, 97, American Jungian analyst and author.
Henry Kalis, 81, American politician, member of the Minnesota House of Representatives (1975–2003).
Erich Kleinschuster, 88, Austrian trombonist and bandleader.
Hans Kloss, 80, German artist and graphic designer.
Gerald LaValle, 86, American politician, member of the Pennsylvania Senate (1990–2008).
Geoff Manning, 92, Australian historian.
Wayne M. Meyers, 94, American microbiologist, chemist and humanitarian.
Walter Mischel, 88, Austrian-born American psychologist, pancreatic cancer.
Billy O'Dell, 85, American baseball player (Baltimore Orioles, San Francisco Giants, Atlanta Braves), complications from Parkinson's disease.
Mark W. Olson, 75, American banker.
Ralph Prouton, 92, English cricketer and footballer.
Jorunn Ringstad, 75, Norwegian politician, MP (1993–2005).
Carl Sargent, 65, British parapsychologist and roleplaying game designer (Fighting Fantasy).
Frank Serafine, 65, American sound designer and editor (Star Trek: The Motion Picture, Tron, The Hunt for Red October), traffic collision.
Shen Chun-shan, 86, Taiwanese physicist and academic, President of National Tsing Hua University (1994–1997), ruptured intestine.
Bettina Shaw-Lawrence, 97, British painter.
Benedict Ganesh Singh, 90, Guyanese Roman Catholic prelate, Bishop of Georgetown (1972–2003).
Rachid Taha, 59, Algerian singer (Carte de Séjour), heart attack.
Albert Ullin, 88, German-born Australian children's bookseller.
Jack N. Young, 91, American actor and stuntman (Death Valley Days, Wagon Train, How the West Was Won).

13
Roman Baskin, 63, Estonian actor and director, cancer.
Diana Baumrind, 91, American psychologist, traffic collision.
Valentin Chaikin, 93, Russian speed skater.
Emmanuel Dabbaghian, 84, Syrian Armenian Catholic hierarch, Archbishop of Baghdad (2007–2017).
Roxana Darín, 87, Argentinian actress.
Sir William Kerr Fraser, 89, British civil servant, Chancellor of the University of Glasgow (1996–2006), Permanent Secretary to the Scottish Office (1978–1988).
Lin Hujia, 101, Chinese politician, Mayor of Beijing (1978–1981) and Tianjin (1978), Minister of Agriculture (1981–1983).
Marin Mazzie, 57, American actress and singer (Ragtime, Kiss Me, Kate, Passion), ovarian cancer.
Ivo Petrić, 87, Slovenian oboist (Slavko Osterc Ensemble) and composer.
K. N. T. Sastry, 73, Indian film director and critic.
Kyle Stone, 54, American pornographic film actor and comedian, cardiovascular disease.
John B. Thomas, 93, American electrical engineer.
Martha Vaughan, 92, American biochemist and physiologist.
Albrecht Wellmer, 85, German philosopher.
John Wilcock, 91, British journalist (The Village Voice), stroke.

14
Alan Abel, 94, American prankster and writer, cancer and heart failure.
Max Bennett, 90, American jazz bassist (L.A. Express) and session musician (The Wrecking Crew).
Beverly Bentley, 88, American actress (Scent of Mystery, C.H.U.D., The Golden Boys).
Bernardo Bello, 84, Chilean footballer (Colo-Colo).
Eusebio Cardoso, 68, Paraguayan Olympic marathon runner (1976).
Phil Clark, 86, American baseball player (St. Louis Cardinals).
Ruth Dowman, 88, New Zealand sprinter and long jumper, British Empire Games bronze medalist (1950).
Majid Gholamnejad, 35, Iranian footballer (Saipa, PAS Hamedan, national team), heart attack.
Anneke Grönloh, 76, Dutch singer.
Branko Grünbaum, 88, Yugoslavian-born American mathematician.
Dinesh Chandra Joarder, 90, Indian politician, MP (1971–1980), MLA (1987–1996).
Saeed Kangarani, 63, Iranian actor (My Uncle Napoleon, Dar Emtedade Shab, Marriage, Iranian Style), heart attack.
Zienia Merton, 72, Burmese-born British actress (The Chairman, Doctor Who, Space: 1999), cancer.
Carlos Rubira Infante, 96, Ecuadorian pasillo and pasacalle singer-songwriter.
Chai-Anan Samudavanija, 74, Thai political scientist.
Rudolf Schieffer, 71, German historian.

15
Scotty Bloch, 93, American actress (Kate & Allie, The Lunch Date).
Lady Elizabeth Cavendish, 92, British aristocrat and courtier.
Helen Clare, 101, British singer
Peggy Clarke, 80, British chess player.
John M. Dwyer, 83, American set decorator (Star Trek, Coal Miner's Daughter, Jaws), complications from Parkinson's disease.
Masashi Fujiwara, 72, Japanese politician, member of the House of Councillors (since 2001), liver cancer.
Jo Gilbert, 63, British film producer (Closing the Ring), brain tumour.
James Haar, 89, American musicologist.
Dorothy M. Kellogg, 98, American politician, Member of the South Dakota House of Representatives (1981–1984) and Senate (1987–1992).
Warwick Estevam Kerr, 96, Brazilian agricultural engineer, geneticist and entomologist.
Kirin Kiki, 75, Japanese actress (Shoplifters, The Triple Cross, Half a Confession), breast cancer.
Silvio Liotta, 82, Italian politician, Deputy (1994–2006).
David Lowenthal, 95, American geographer and historian.
Mike Margulis, 68, American Olympic soccer player (1972).
Lionello Puppi, 86, Italian art historian and politician, Senator (1985–1987).
Charles Rappleye, 62, American writer, cancer.
Clay Riddell, 81, Canadian geologist and oil executive (Paramount Resources), co-owner of the Calgary Flames.
David Rubadiri, 88, Malawian poet and diplomat.
José Manuel de la Sota, 68, Argentinian politician, Senator (1995–1999), Governor of Córdoba (1999–2007, 2011–2015), traffic collision.
Dudley Sutton, 85, British actor (Lovejoy, The Devils, The Pink Panther Strikes Again), cancer.
Victor Veselago, 89, Russian physicist.
Jean Briggs Watters, 92, British cryptanalyst and Women's Royal Naval Service personnel.
Virginia Whitehill, 90, American women's rights activist.
Fritz Wintersteller, 90, Austrian mountaineer.

16
Iris Acker, 88, American actress (Flight of the Navigator, Whoops Apocalypse, Cocoon: The Return), pancreatic cancer.
Perry Miller Adato, 97, American documentary film director and producer.
Maartin Allcock, 61, English multi-instrumentalist (Fairport Convention, Jethro Tull, Robert Plant) and record producer, liver cancer.
Kevin Beattie, 64, English footballer (Ipswich Town, Middlesbrough, national team), heart attack.
Tommy Best, 97, Welsh footballer (Hereford United, Cardiff City, Chester).
Assid Corban, 93, New Zealand politician, Mayor of Waitakere City (1989–1992), cancer.
Albuíno Cunha de Azeredo, 73, Brazilian engineer and politician, Governor of Espírito Santo (1991–1995).
John F. Kelly, 69, American politician, member of the Michigan Senate (1979–1994), heart attack.
Jim Kettle, 93, Australian footballer (Fitzroy).
Jone Kubuabola, 72, Fijian politician, Minister for Finance (2000–2006).
Big Jay McNeely, 91, American R&B saxophonist, prostate cancer.
Min Naiben, 83, Chinese physicist, member of the Academy of Sciences.
John Molony, 91, Australian historian.
Frank Parker, 79, American actor (Days of Our Lives), complications from dementia and Parkinson's disease.
James B. Thayer, 96, American army brigadier general.
Butch Wade, 73, American basketball player (Indiana State Sycamores).
Wang Guofa, 72, Chinese politician, Vice Governor of Jilin Province, Chairman of the Jilin CPPCC.
Michael Young, 59, Australian footballer (Carlton, Melbourne), cancer.

17
Celia Barquín Arozamena, 22, Spanish golfer, stabbed.
Enzo Calzaghe, 69, Italian-born Welsh boxing trainer.
*Captain Raju, 68, Indian military officer and actor (Nalla Naal, Rowdy Alludu, Cotton Mary), complications from a stroke.
*Maninder Singh Dhir, 66, Indian politician, complications from a stroke.
Stephen Jeffreys, 68, British playwright and screenwriter (The Libertine, Diana), brain tumour.
Dean Lindo, 86, Belizean politician, member of the House of Representatives (1974–1979, 1984–1989).
Anna Rajam Malhotra, 91, Indian civil servant (Indian Administrative Service).
Annette Michelson, 95, American film and art critic, dementia.
Daniel N. Robinson, 81, American philosopher, heart failure.

18
Steve Adlard, 67, English football player and coach (Marquette Warriors), cancer.
James Allan, 86, British diplomat, High Commissioner to Mauritius (1981–1985) and Ambassador to Mozambique (1986–1989).
Ernie Bateman, 89, English footballer (Watford).
Gian Luigi Boiardi, 67, Italian politician, Deputy (2001–2005), heart attack.
Carlo Dell'Aringa, 77, Italian politician, Deputy (2013–2018), heart attack.
David DiChiera, 83, American composer and founding general director of Michigan Opera Theatre, pancreatic cancer.
Lady Judith Kazantzis, 78, British poet.
Piotr Lachert, 80, Polish composer and pianist.
Carmencita Lara, 91, Peruvian singer.
Marceline Loridan-Ivens, 90, French writer, film director and Holocaust survivor.
Titti Maartmann, 97, Norwegian luger.
Lawrence Martin-Bittman, 87, Czech-born American artist, author and intelligence officer.
Jean Piat, 93, French actor (Clara de Montargis, Rider on the Rain, The Accursed Kings) and writer.
Richard M. Pollack, 83, American mathematician.
Livingstone Puckerin, 49, Barbadian cricketer.
Robert Venturi, 93, American architect, Pritzker Prize winner (1991), complications from Alzheimer's disease.
Norifumi Yamamoto, 41, Japanese mixed martial artist (Shooto, Hero's, UFC), stomach cancer.

19
Dave Barrett, 63, American news radio correspondent (CBS, ABC, Fox), three-time Edward R. Murrow Award winner, heart attack.
Sir Louis Blom-Cooper, 92, British lawyer.
Geta Brătescu, 92, Romanian visual artist.
Buren Bayaer, 58, Chinese singer and journalist, heart attack.
Jon Burge, 70, American police officer (Chicago Police Department), suspected mass torturer and convicted perjurer.
Bunny Carr, 91, Irish television presenter (Quicksilver).
Catherine Castel, 69, French actress (The Nude Vampire, Lips of Blood).
Geoff Clayton, 80, English cricketer (Lancashire, Somerset).
John Hopkins, 81, British academic lawyer.
Vishnu Khare, 78, Indian poet and writer, stroke.
Kondapalli Koteswaramma, 100, Indian communist revolutionary and writer, stroke.
Győző Kulcsár, 77, Hungarian fencer, Olympic champion (1964, 1968, 1972).
Marilyn Lloyd, 89, American politician, U.S. Representative from Tennessee's 3rd congressional district (1975–1995), complications from pneumonia.
David Wong Louie, 63, American writer, throat cancer.
Arthur Mitchell, 84, American dancer and choreographer, founder of the Dance Theatre of Harlem, heart failure.
Wojciech Myrda, 39, Polish basketball player (Avtodor Saratov).
Keith Nord, 61, American football player (Minnesota Vikings), cancer.
Denis Norden, 96, English comedy writer (Take It from Here), television presenter (It'll Be Alright on the Night) and radio personality (My Music).
Gamil Ratib, 91, Egyptian-French actor (Lawrence of Arabia).
Pavel Řezníček, 76, Czech poet, writer and translator.
Jesús Rodríguez Magro, 58, Spanish racing cyclist, heart attack.
Joseph E. Schwartzberg, 90, American geographer.

20
Edmundo Abaya, 89, Filipino Roman Catholic prelate, Archbishop of Nueva Segovia (1999–2005).
İbrahim Ayhan, 50, Turkish politician, MP (since 2011), heart attack.
Fadhil Jalil al-Barwari, 52, Iraqi military officer, commander of the Iraqi Special Operations Forces, heart attack.
Maria Bitner-Glindzicz, 55, British geneticist, traffic collision.
John Cunliffe, 85, English children's book author (Postman Pat, Rosie and Jim), heart failure.
Ulrich Everling, 93, German jurist, Judge at the European Court of Justice (1980–1988).
Inge Feltrinelli, 87, German-born Italian publisher and photographer.
George N. Hatsopoulos, 91, Greek-born American mechanical engineer.
Huang Qingyun, 98, Hong Kong-Chinese children's author.
Jacob Israelachvili, 74, Israeli-born American professor, cancer.
Joseph Hoo Kim, 76, Jamaican record producer, liver cancer.
K-Run's Park Me In First, 13, American beagle show dog, winner of the 2008 Westminster Best in Show, cancer.
Lou Karras, 91, American football player (Washington Redskins).
Mohammed Karim Lamrani, 99, Moroccan politician and holding investor, Prime Minister (1971–1972, 1983–1986, 1992–1994).
Laurie Mitchell, 90, American actress (Queen of Outer Space).
Ranganayaki Rajagopalan, 86, Indian veena player, complications from Parkinson's disease.
Nils Rydström, 97, Swedish Olympic fencer (1948, 1952).
Mohamed Sahnoun, 87, Algerian diplomat, Ambassador to the United States (1984–1989).
Ludovikus Simanullang, 63, Indonesian Roman Catholic prelate, Bishop of Sibolga (since 2007), sepsis.
Reinhard Tritscher, 72, Austrian Olympic alpine skier (1972), climbing accident.
Conrado Walter, 95, German-born Brazilian Roman Catholic prelate, Bishop of Jacarezinho (1991–2000).
Wang Mengshu, 79, Chinese railway engineer, member of the Chinese Academy of Engineering.
William Ward, 74, American astronomer, brain tumor.
Henry Wessel Jr., 76, American photographer, lung cancer.
Riccardo Zinna, 60, Italian actor (Nirvana, This Is Not Paradise, Benvenuti al Sud) and composer, pancreatic cancer.

21
David Bamigboye, 77, Nigerian military officer and politician, Governor of Kwara (1967–1975).
Sophie Body-Gendrot, 75, French academic.
Eigil Friis-Christensen, 73, Danish geophysicist.
Katherine Hoover, 80, American composer and flutist.
Adolf Knoll, 80, Austrian footballer (Wiener Sport-Club, FK Austria Wien, national team).
José Roberto López Londoño, 82, Colombian Roman Catholic prelate, Bishop of Armenia (1987–2003) and Jericó (2003–2013).
David Laro, 76, American judge.
Vitaliy Masol, 89, Ukrainian politician, Prime Minister (1994–1995).
Herbert Meier, 90, Swiss writer and translator.
Howard Michaels, 62, American businessman, cancer.
Zinaida Mirkina, 92, Russian poet and translator.
Kevin Phillips, 89, Australian footballer (Collingwood).
Bernard Szczepański, 72, Polish Olympic wrestler (1972).
Lee Stange, 81, American baseball player (Minnesota Twins, Cleveland Indians, Boston Red Sox).
Trần Đại Quang, 61, Vietnamese politician, President (since 2016), Minister of Public Security (2011–2016), virus.
Xu Delong, 66, Chinese materials scientist, Vice President of the Chinese Academy of Engineering.

22
Barry Cohen, 79, American attorney, leukemia.
Avi Duan, 62, Israeli politician, member of the Knesset (2012–2013).
Adel Hekal, 84, Egyptian footballer (Al-Ahly, national team).
Chas Hodges, 74, British musician (Chas & Dave), organ failure.
Johannes Kapp, 89, German Roman Catholic prelate, Auxiliary Bishop of Fulda (1976–2004).
Mike Labinjo, 38, Canadian football player (Calgary Stampeders, Miami Dolphins, Philadelphia Eagles).
Bob Lienhard, 70, American basketball player (Cantù), cancer.
Imtikumzuk Longkumer, 51, Indian politician, heart attack.
Al Matthews, 75, American actor (Aliens, The Fifth Element, The American Way).
Edna Molewa, 61, South African politician, Minister of Environmental Affairs (since 2010) and Social Development (2009–2010), Premier of North West (2004–2009).
Dolly Niemiec, 87, American baseball player (AAGPBL).
Hayden Poulter, 57, New Zealand serial killer, suicide.
Ottokar Runze, 93, German filmmaker (Five Suspects, In the Name of the People, A Lost Life).
Mario Valiante, 93, Italian politician, MP (1958–1983).
Sir Eric Yarrow, 98, British businessman.

23
Olav Angell, 86, Norwegian poet and jazz musician.
Baek Sang-seung, 82, South Korean politician, Mayor of Gyeongju (since 2002), lymphoma.
Eric Berntson, 77, Canadian politician, MLA (1975–1990).
Ciriaco Calalang, 67, Filipino politician, member of the House of Representatives (since 2018), stroke.
Jane Fortune, 76, American author, journalist and historian, cancer.
Sir Charles Kao, 84, Hong Kong electrical engineer, Nobel Prize laureate (2009), complications from Alzheimer's disease.
Helmut Köglberger, 72, Austrian footballer (LASK, Austria/WAC, national team).
Gary Kurtz, 78, American film producer (American Graffiti, Star Wars, The Dark Crystal), cancer.
Kalpana Lajmi, 64, Indian filmmaker (Rudaali), kidney and liver failure.
Liu Jie, 103, Chinese politician, Governor of Henan (1979–1981).
Mark Livolsi, 56, American film editor (The Devil Wears Prada, Saving Mr. Banks, We Bought a Zoo).
John Anthony Nevin, 85, American psychologist, pancreatic cancer.
Shantaram Potdukhe, 86, Indian politician, MP (1980–1996).
Kidari Sarveswara Rao, Indian politician, shot.
Gennady Ulanov, 88, Russian politician.
Harry Walden, 77, English footballer (Luton Town, Northampton Town).
Derek Wheatley, 92, English barrister and novelist.
David Wolkowsky, 99, American property developer.

24
Roy Booth, 91, English cricketer (Yorkshire, Worcestershire).
Norm Breyfogle, 58, American comic book artist (Batman, Superman, Prime), complications from a stroke.
Jim Brogan, 74, Scottish footballer (Celtic, national team), dementia.
Ronald Bye, 80, Norwegian politician, Minister of Transport and Communications (1978–1981).
José María Hurtado Ruiz-Tagle, 73, Chilean politician, Deputy (1990–1998).
Peter Maurice King, 78, Australian politician, MP (1981).
Arnold Krammer, 77, American historian.
Marion Marshall, 89, American actress (I Was a Male War Bride, The Stooge, Sailor Beware).
Ivar Martinsen, 97, Norwegian Olympic speed skater (1948, 1952).
Tommy McDonald, 84, American football player (Philadelphia Eagles).
Terry Moore, 82, Canadian broadcaster and author, cancer.
Michael O'Gorman, 53, American coxswain. (death announced on this date)
Merv Smith, 85, New Zealand radio personality (1ZB) and actor (The Hobbit: The Battle of the Five Armies).
Lars Wohlin, 85, Swedish politician, Governor of the National Bank (1979–1982), MEP (2004–2009).

25
Helena Almeida, 84, Portuguese photographer and painter.
Galal Amin, 83, Egyptian economist.
Evelyn Anthony, 92, British author.
Charles Berger, 79, American communication theorist, cancer.
Andrew Colin, 82, British computer scientist.
Marie Colton, 95, American politician, member of the North Carolina House of Representatives (1978–1994).
Baba Hari Dass, 95, Indian yoga master, silent monk, and commentator.
Friedhelm Döhl, 82, German composer.
Karyn Dwyer, 43, Canadian actress (Superstar, Better Than Chocolate, The Right Way), suicide.
Ismail Fahd Ismail, 78, Kuwaiti novelist and literary critic.
Ivan Kapitanets, 90, Russian military officer, Admiral of the Fleet.
Danny Lewicki, 87, Canadian ice hockey player (Toronto Maple Leafs).
Jack McKinney, 83, American basketball coach (Indiana Pacers, Los Angeles Lakers, Saint Joseph's Hawks).
Sam Morshead, 63, Irish jockey and horse racing administrator (Perth Racecourse), cancer.
Wenceslao Padilla, 68, Filipino Roman Catholic prelate, Apostolic Prefect of Ulaanbaatar (since 1992).
Yadollah Samadi, 66, Iranian film director, heart failure.
Ronnie Shelton, 57, American convicted serial rapist.
Jasdev Singh, 87, Indian sports commentator.
Jerry Thorpe, 92, American director and producer (Kung Fu).
Vladimir Voronkov, 74, Russian cross-country skier, Olympic champion (1972).

26
Joe Carolan, 81, Irish footballer (Manchester United, Brighton & Hove Albion, national team).
Ivan Deyanov, 80, Bulgarian footballer (Dimitrovgrad, Lokomotiv Sofia, national team).
Eric Griffiths, 65, British academic and literary critic.
Ignaz Kirchner, 72, Austrian actor (Burgtheater).
Tito Madi, 89, Brazilian singer and composer.
George F. Perpich, 85, American dentist and politician, Member of the Minnesota State Senate (1971–1980), complications from Parkinson's disease.
Charles Poliquin, 57, Canadian strength coach, heart attack.
Roger Robinson, 78, American actor (Joe Turner's Come and Gone, Kojak, Rubicon), Tony winner (2009).
Manuel Rodríguez, 79, Chilean footballer (Unión Española, national team), complications from Parkinson's disease.
Antonio Santucci, 89, Italian Roman Catholic prelate, Bishop of Trivento (1985–2005).
Andrew O. Skaar, 96, American politician, Member of the Minnesota House of Representatives (1963–1974).
José Antonio Tébez, 69, Argentinian footballer (San Martín de Mendoza, Independiente Santa Fe, Independiente Medellín).
Aamer Wasim, 58, Pakistani cricket player and coach.

27
Cy A Adler, 91, American author, organiser and conservationist.
Marty Balin, 76, American Hall of Fame rock singer and musician (Jefferson Airplane, Jefferson Starship).
Carles Canut, 74, Spanish actor (The Knight of the Dragon) and theater manager.
Tara Fares, 22, Iraqi model and blogger, shot.
Ray Fogarty, 61, American politician, member of the Rhode Island House of Representatives (1983–1992).
Frank Ford, 83, Australian theatre promoter (Adelaide Fringe Festival).
Frank Herbert, 87, American politician, member of the New Jersey Senate (1977–1981).
Blagoje Istatov, 71, Macedonian football player (Partizan Belgrade, Utrecht) and manager (Skopje).
Brian A. Joyce, 56, American politician, member of the Massachusetts Senate (1998–2017).
James Lawton, 75, British sports journalist and biographer.
Anita Madden, 85, American racehorse owner, political activist and socialite.
Kavita Mahajan, 51, Indian writer, pneumonia.
James G. March, 90, American sociologist.
Ernest Maxin, 95, British television producer and choreographer (Morecambe and Wise).
Namkhai Norbu, 79, Tibetan-born Italian Buddhist monk and Dzogchen teacher.
Michael Payton, 48, American Hall of Fame football player (Marshall Thundering Herd), cancer.
Manoharsinhji Pradyumansinhji, 82, Indian cricketer (Saurashtra) and politician, MLA (1967–1971, 1980–1985, 1990–1995).
Virginia Ramos, 65, Mexican-born American chef.
Joaquim Roriz, 82, Brazilian politician, Governor of the Federal District (1988–1990, 1991–1994, 1999–2006).
Yvonne Suhor, 56, American actress (The Young Riders), pancreatic cancer.
Philip Trenary, 64, American airline executive (Pinnacle Airlines), shot.
Art Williams, 78, American basketball player (Boston Celtics), stroke.

28
Peter Adams, 82, Canadian politician, MPP (1987–1990), MP (1993–2006), cancer and kidney failure.
Tamaz Chiladze, 87, Georgian writer and poet (The Pond, The Brueghel Moon).
Barnabas Sibusiso Dlamini, 76, Swazi politician, Prime Minister (1996–2003, 2008–2018).
Edredon Bleu, 26, British racehorse, winner of the King George VI Chase (2003), euthanised.
Predrag Ejdus, 71, Serbian actor.
Peter Gelling, 58, Australian musician and author.
Ito Giani, 77, Italian Olympic sprinter (1964).
Rachel Hirschfeld, 72, American animal welfare lawyer.
Wes Hopkins, 57, American football player (Philadelphia Eagles).
Bob Jane, 88, Australian race car driver and entrepreneur (Bob Jane T-Marts), prostate cancer.
Joe Masteroff, 98, American playwright (Cabaret, She Loves Me), Tony winner (1967).
David Schippers, 88, American lawyer, Chief Investigative Counsel for the U.S. House Judiciary Committee (1998), pancreatic cancer.
Sidney Shachnow, 83, Lithuanian-born American Army general and Holocaust survivor.
Rajendra Shah, 68, Indian cricketer.
Shi Shengjie, 65, Chinese xiangsheng comedian.
Juris Silovs, 68, Latvian athlete, Olympic silver (1972) and bronze medalist (1976).
Celso José Pinto da Silva, 84, Brazilian Roman Catholic prelate, Bishop of Vitória da Conquista (1981–2001), Archbishop of Teresina (2001–2008).
Greg Terrion, 58, Canadian ice hockey player (Toronto Maple Leafs, Los Angeles Kings).
Margo Woode, 90, American actress (Somewhere in the Night).
Zang Tianshuo, 54, Chinese rock musician, liver cancer.

29
Luigi Agnolin, 75, Italian Hall of Fame football referee.
Macià Alavedra, 84, Spanish politician, Deputy (1977–1979, 1982–1986).
Alves Barbosa, 86, Portuguese racing cyclist.
Tulsidas Borkar, 83, Indian harmonium player, chest infection.
Thomas E. Brennan, 89, American jurist, Chief Justice of the Michigan Supreme Court (1969–1970).
Pascale Casanova, 59, French literary critic.
Alain Ducellier, 84, French historian.
Lewis Elton, 95, German-born British physicist and researcher.
Eugene John Gerber, 87, American Roman Catholic prelate, Bishop of Dodge City (1976–1982) and Wichita (1982–2001), heart attack.
Hu Chuanzhi, 88, Chinese engineer and politician, CEO of the China State Shipbuilding Corporation.
Rolf Knierim, 90, German biblical scholar, traffic collision.
Frank Maine, 81, Canadian politician, MP (1974–1979).
Angela Maria, 89, Brazilian singer.
Billy Neville, 83, Irish footballer (West Ham).
Henry Ong, 68, Malaysian-born American playwright, cancer.
Stefania Podgórska, 97, Polish Holocaust heroine and award winner (Righteous Among the Nations).
Peter Robeson, 88, British equestrian, Olympic bronze medalist (1956, 1964).
Otis Rush, 84, American Hall of Fame blues guitarist and singer ("All Your Love", "I Can't Quit You Baby", "Double Trouble"), complications from a stroke.
Richard A. Searfoss, 62, American astronaut.
Stepan Topal, 80, Moldovan politician, Governor of Gagauzia (1990–1995), MP (1990–1994).
Mille-Marie Treschow, 64, Norwegian estate owner.
Dirceu Vegini, 66, Brazilian Roman Catholic prelate, Bishop of Foz do Iguaçu (2010–2018).
Claudie Weill, 72–73, French historian.
Earle F. Zeigler, 99, American-Canadian academic.

30
Maurice Barrette, 62, Canadian ice hockey player.
Michael J. Bennane, 73, American politician, member of the Michigan House of Representatives (1977–1996).
Geoffrey Hayes, 76, English television presenter (Rainbow) and actor (Z-Cars), pneumonia.
David Henderson, 91, British economist.
Wilhelm Keim, 83, German chemist.
Walter Laqueur, 97, German-born American historian and journalist.
Kim Larsen, 72, Danish rock singer, songwriter and guitarist (Gasolin'), prostate cancer.
Carlos Ángel López, 66, Argentine footballer (Sarmiento, Millonarios, national team).
John J. McDermott, 86, American philosopher.
Robert M. O'Neil, 83, American educator, President of the University of Wisconsin System (1980–1985) and the University of Virginia (1985–1990).
Sonia Orbuch, 93, Polish Jewish resistance fighter and Holocaust educator.
René Pétillon, 72, French satirical and political cartoonist.
William Proffit, 82, American orthodontist.
Sophon Ratanakorn, 87, Thai jurist, President of the Supreme Court of Thailand (1990–1991).
Czesław Strumiłło, 88, Polish chemical engineer.

References

2018-09
 09